The 1891 World Allround Speed Skating Championships took place at 6 and 7 January at the ice rink Museumplein in Amsterdam, the Netherlands. It's an unofficial championship because there was no International Skating Union (ISU is founded in 1892)

Four distances were skated at the World Championship, the ½ mile (850 meter), the 1 mile (1609 meter),  the 2 miles (3219 meter) and the 5 miles (8047 meter). One became champion if one won three of the four distances.

The American Joe Donoghue won all the four distances and became the first World allround champion.

Allround results 

  * = Fell
 NC = Not classified
 NF = Not finished
 NS = Not started
 DQ = Disqualified
Source: SpeedSkatingStats.com

Rules 
Four distances have to be skated:
 ½ mile (805 m)
 1 mile (1609 m)
 2 miles (3219 m)
 5 miles (8047 meter)

One could only win the World Championships by winning at three of the four distances, so there would be no World Champion if no skater won three distances.

The winner of the ½ mile was decided by a final of the best four skaters of the distance. If the same time was skated a skate-off is skated to decide the ranking.

Silver and bronze medals were not awarded.

References 

World Allround Speed Skating Championships, 1891
1891 World Allround
World Allround, 1891
World Allround Speed Skating Championships, 1891
January 1891 sports events
1891 in the Netherlands
19th century in Amsterdam